Charles McIlvaine may refer to:
Charles Pettit McIlvaine (1799–1873), Episcopalian bishop in America
Charles McIlvaine (mycologist) (1840–1909), American author and mycologist
Charles McIlvaine (rower) (1906–1975), American rower